The Gallo Center for the Arts is a performing arts center in Modesto, California.

The building was formally opened on September 27, 2007 and features two theaters: the Mary Stuart Rogers Theater and the Foster Family Theater. The Gallo Center hosts six resident companies: Central West Ballet, the Modesto Community Concerts Association, the Modesto Symphony Orchestra, Modesto Performing Arts, Opera Modesto, and YES (Youth Entertainment Stage) Company. The Center has been toured and visited by many stars and notable figures since its opening day, with Patti LuPone becoming the first star to perform in the Mary Stuart Rogers Theater. Touring Broadway shows have also performed at the Center, from Evita and Cats to newer shows such as Shrek: The Musical.

References

Culture of Modesto, California
Buildings and structures in Modesto, California
Performing arts centers in California
Tourist attractions in Stanislaus County, California
Theatres completed in 2007
2007 establishments in California